William David Peterman (March 20, 1921 – March 13, 1999) was a Major League Baseball catcher. Peterman played for the Philadelphia Phillies in the  season. In 1 career game, he had 1 hit in 1 at-bat, having a 1.000 career batting average. He batted and threw right-handed.

Peterman was born and died in Philadelphia, Pennsylvania.

External links

1921 births
1999 deaths
Philadelphia Phillies players
Major League Baseball catchers
Baseball players from Pennsylvania
Ottawa-Ogdensburg Senators players
Wausau Timberjacks players
Williamsport Grays players
Utica Blue Sox players
Lincoln A's players
Birmingham Barons players
Savannah Indians players
Augusta Tigers players